The following is a list of MTV Asia Awards winners for Favorite Artist India.

MTV Asia Awards